Escape to France (Italian:Fuga in Francia) is a 1948 Italian drama film directed by Mario Soldati and starring Folco Lulli, Enrico Olivieri and Rosi Mirafiore.

A former Fascist takes his son and escapes across the border into France, where he tries to avoid being recognized and having to pay for his wartime crimes.

Cast
 Folco Lulli as Riccardo Torre  
 Enrico Olivieri as Fabrizio Torre  
 Rosi Mirafiore as Pierina  
 Pietro Germi as Tembien  
 Mario Vercellone as Gino  
 Giovanni Dufour as Il Tunisino  
 Cesare Olivieri as don Giacomo  
 Gino Apostolo as Policeman 
 Gianni Luda as Bootlegger  
Mario Soldati as Stiffi

References

Bibliography 
 Miguel Mera & David Burnand. European Film Music. Ashgate Publishing, 2006.

External links 
 

1948 films
Italian drama films
1948 drama films
1940s Italian-language films
Films set in France
Films directed by Mario Soldati
Italian black-and-white films
Lux Film films
Films scored by Nino Rota
1940s Italian films